Carl Mario D'Aquila (August 1, 1924 – September 9, 2005) was an American politician. journalist, and advertising agent.

D'Aquila was born in Hibbing, Minnesota and graduated from Hibbing High School in 1946. He went to Hibbing Community College and to Marquette University. D'Aquila served as an overseas civilian expediter for the United States Air Force during World War II. He was involved with the advertising and newspaper businesses and was a radio commentor. D'Aquila served in the Minnesota House of Representatives from 1947 to 1950. In 1962, D'Aquila lost the Republican nomination for the office of Lieutenant Governor of Minnesota. He served on the Minnesota Metropolitan Airports Commission from 1996 to 2004. D'Aquila died from adrenal cancer at his home in Saint Paul, Minnesota. The funeral and burial was in Hibbing, Minnesota.

References

1924 births
2005 deaths
People from Hibbing, Minnesota
United States Air Force civilians
Marquette University alumni
Businesspeople from Minnesota
Journalists from Minnesota
Republican Party members of the Minnesota House of Representatives
Deaths from cancer in Minnesota